The Jack London Revue is a jazz club in Portland, Oregon, United States. The venue is beneath the Rialto Poolroom Bar and Cafe at the intersection of Southwest Fourth Avenue and Southwest Alder Street in downtown Portland. The Jack London Revue opened on May 27, 2017, shortly after Jimmy Mak's closed, and replacing the Jack London Bar. The venue is owned by Frank Faillace and Manish Patel. It has a seating capacity of 220, as of June 2017.

See also
 List of jazz venues in the United States

References

2017 establishments in Oregon
Jazz clubs in Oregon
Music venues in Portland, Oregon
Southwest Portland, Oregon